Aquagrill was a seafood restaurant located at 210 Spring Street (on the corner of Sixth Avenue), in SoHo in Manhattan, in New York City.  It was opened in 1996 by owners Jennifer and Jeremy Marshall and closed in June, 2020, due to the economic effects of the COVID-19 pandemic.

The menu included items such as tuna carpaccio, salmon tartare, crabcakes, falafel salmon, miso sea bass, mushroom truffle crusted cod, bouillabaisse, shrimp, lobster, clams and oysters.  Jeremy Marshall was the chef. In 2017 Zagat's  gave Aquagrill a food rating of 27, and awarded it Top 50 Best Restaurants in NYC, Best Brunch in NYC, Best Oyster Raw Bar and Best Seafood Restaurant. In 2013, Zagat's gave Aquagrill a food rating of 27. Jennifer Marshall was the Wine Director and Aquagrill's wine list has been awarded over two decades of the Wine Spectator's Award of Excellence  and has been awarded The Best Short Wine List in America by Restauarant Hospitality magazine. Aquagrill has been awarded Tripadvisor's Best Seafood Restaurants in NYC  and Trip Advisor's Certificate of Excellence

See also
 Impact of the COVID-19 pandemic on the restaurant industry in the United States
 List of seafood restaurants

References

External links
 

1996 establishments in New York City
2020 disestablishments in New York (state)
Defunct restaurants in New York City
Defunct seafood restaurants in the United States
Restaurants disestablished during the COVID-19 pandemic
Restaurants disestablished in 2020
Restaurants established in 1996
Restaurants in Manhattan
Seafood restaurants in New York (state)
SoHo, Manhattan